Rehbra is a 2022 Pakistani romantic comedy film, directed by Amin Iqbal and produced by Saira Afzal. The film stars Ahsan Khan and Ayesha Omer.

Cast 
 Ahsan Khan as Danish
 Ayesha Omer as Bubbly
Sarish Khan
Rimal Ali
 Saba Faisal
 Sohail Sameer
 Ghulam Mohiuddin

Production 
In 2017, Ahsan Khan stated that, "The film is almost done, it's 95% done." Khan and Omer resumed the shooting in January 2020. The principal shooting for the film was wrapped in September 2021.

Release 
The film has had its release date repeatedly postponed. It was first scheduled to release in 2020, but later got postponed. It was later released countrywide on 24 June 2022.

See also
 Cinema of Pakistan
 Lollywood

References

External links 
 
 

2020s Urdu-language films
Pakistani romantic comedy films
Urdu-language Pakistani films